Li Zhiguang (born 1 June 1983) is a Chinese cross-country skier. He competed in the men's 30 kilometre pursuit event at the 2006 Winter Olympics.

References

External links
 

1983 births
Living people
Chinese male cross-country skiers
Olympic cross-country skiers of China
Cross-country skiers at the 2006 Winter Olympics
Place of birth missing (living people)